Kelly Cooke (born October 29, 1990) is an American ice hockey official, currently serving as a referee in the American Hockey League (AHL). A retired ice hockey forward, she played with the Boston Blades of the Canadian Women's Hockey League (CWHL) during the 2013–14 and 2014–15 seasons, and with the Boston Pride of the Premier Hockey Federation (PHF; previously NWHL) during the 2015–16 season. Her college ice hockey career was spent with the Princeton Tigers in the ECAC Hockey conference of the NCAA Division 1.

Playing career
After graduating from Princeton University in 2013, Cooke was selected by the Boston Blades with the 35th overall pick in the 2013 CWHL Draft. In 2015, Cooke signed with the Boston Pride of the newly-created National Women's Hockey League (NWHL) professional league. On December 31, 2015, she participated in the 2016 Outdoor Women's Classic, the first outdoor professional women's ice hockey game.

Following her retirement from the NWHL in 2016, Cooke served as the league's Director of Player Safety.

Officiating career
In September 2019, Cooke became one of four women to officiate at the NHL level for the first time, working in an NHL Prospect Tournament hosted by the Nashville Predators in Nashville, Tennessee.

Cooke was also joined by Katie Guay, Kendall Hanley, and Kirsten Welsh as officials who worked the Elite Women's 3-on-3 event at the 2020 National Hockey League All-Star Game at Enterprise Center in St. Louis.

Also in 2020, Cooke served as a referee at the 2020 IIHF Women's U18 World Championship and officiated the bronze medal game, a 6–1 victory by Russia over Finland.

Personal
Cooke graduated from the Northeastern University School of Law in 2019.

References

External links
 
 Kelly Cooke at Princeton Tigers
 

Living people
1990 births
Ice hockey people from Massachusetts
People from Andover, Massachusetts
American ice hockey officials
American women's ice hockey forwards
National Hockey League officials
Boston Blades players
Boston Pride players
Clarkson Cup champions
Isobel Cup champions
Premier Hockey Federation players
Northeastern University School of Law alumni
Princeton Tigers women's ice hockey players
Princeton University alumni